Mathematics of Computation is a bimonthly mathematics journal focused on computational mathematics. It was established in 1943 as Mathematical Tables and other Aids to Computation, obtaining its current name in 1960. Articles older than five years are available electronically free of charge.

Abstracting and indexing 
The journal is abstracted and indexed in Mathematical Reviews, Zentralblatt MATH, Science Citation Index, CompuMath Citation Index, and Current Contents/Physical, Chemical & Earth Sciences. According to the Journal Citation Reports, the journal has a 2020 impact factor of 2.417.

References

External links 
 

Delayed open access journals
English-language journals
Mathematics journals
Publications established in 1943
American Mathematical Society academic journals
Bimonthly journals